The Anglican Diocese of Ika is one of 12 within the Anglican Province of Bendel, itself one of 14 provinces within the Church of Nigeria. The  current bishop is Godfrey Ifeanyichukwu Ekpenisi.

The previous bishop was Peter Imhona Onekpe who left in 2018; he was the pioneer bishop when the Diocese of Ika was created in 2001.

References

Church of Nigeria dioceses
Dioceses of the Province of Bendel